The Karmutsen Formation is a Late Triassic volcanic sequence of tholeiitic pillow basalts and breccias on Vancouver Island, British Columbia, Canada. It is perhaps the thickest accreted section of an oceanic plateau worldwide, exposing up to 6000 m of basal sediment-sill complexes, basaltic to picritic pillow lavas, pillow breccia, and thick, massive basalt flows. The widespread succession of basalts and breccias are part of the Insular Mountains, a large volcanic mountain range that forms Vancouver Island and Haida Gwaii. In Strathcona Provincial Park, pillow basalts is the most abundant rock unit. About half the mountains, including the highest ones, are carved from these basalts, such as Golden Hinde, which is the highest peak on Vancouver Island.

See also
Volcanism of Western Canada

References

Volcanism of British Columbia
Geography of Vancouver Island
Flood basalts
Triassic volcanism